This a list of holidays in Nauru, an island nation in Micronesia.

Notes

References 
 

Nauru
Events in Nauru
Nauru